Luka Maisuradze (born 30 January 1998, Khashuri, Georgia) is a Georgian judoka.

He won a bronze medal at the 2019 World Judo Championships.

In 2020, he won one of the bronze medals in the men's 81 kg event at the 2020 European Judo Championships held in Prague, Czech Republic.

References

External links
 
 

1998 births
Living people
Male judoka from Georgia (country)
Judoka at the 2019 European Games
European Games medalists in judo
European Games bronze medalists for Georgia (country)
People from Shida Kartli